The Constitutional Court of Romania is the institution which rules on whether the laws, decrees or other bills enacted by Romanian authorities are in conformity with the Constitution.

It consists of nine members serving nine-year terms which cannot be extended, with three members each appointed by the President, the Senate and the Chamber of Deputies. Three members are renewed every 3 years.

Powers

According to the Article 144 of the Constitution, the Constitutional Court exercises the following powers:
 to adjudicate on the constitutionality of laws, before promulgation, upon notification by the President of Romania, by the President of either Chamber of Parliament, by the Government, the Supreme Court of Justice, by a number of at least 50 Deputies or at least 25 Senators, as well as, ex officio, on initiatives to revise the Constitution
 to adjudicate on the constitutionality of the Standing Orders of Parliament, upon notification by the President of either Chamber, by a parliamentary group or a number of at least 50 Deputies or at least 25 Senators
 to decide on exceptions brought to the Courts of law as to the unconstitutionality of laws and orders
 to guard the observance of the procedure for the election of the President of Romania and to confirm the ballot returns
 to ascertain the circumstances which justify the interim in the exercise of office of President of Romania, and to report its findings to Parliament and the Government
 to give advisory opinion on the proposal to suspend the President of Romania from office
 to guard the observance of the procedure for the organization and holding of a referendum, and to confirm its returns
 to check on compliance with the conditions for the exercise of the legislative initiative by citizens
 to decide on objections of unconstitutionality of a political party

Members

Current structure

History 
Since it was created in 1992, the Constitutional Court had the following composition.

<div style="overflow:auto">

See also
Judiciary of Romania
High Court of Cassation and Justice
Rule of law
Rule According to Higher Law

References

External links

Courts in Romania
Constitutional Court
Romania